Antwon Tanner (born April 14, 1975) is an American actor. He is best known for his recurring role as Michael on the UPN sitcom Moesha (1996–97), and its spinoff The Parkers (2001) and as Antwon "Skills" Taylor on the drama series, One Tree Hill. He is also known for his role as Jaron "Worm" Willis in the 2005 film Coach Carter.

Career
Tanner is mostly known by his role as Antwon "Skills" Taylor on the CW show One Tree Hill. Tanner had a starring role in the 2005 film Coach Carter, where he starred alongside Samuel L. Jackson and has appeared in TV series such as NYPD Blue, 413 Hope St., Sister, Sister, Moesha, The Parkers, and CSI. Tanner also had a role in the film The Wood. In 2007, he starred alongside Brian Hooks, Denyce Lawton, and Cherie Johnson in the horror film 7eventy 5ive.

Personal
Tanner was arrested on April 16, 2009, and was accused by federal authorities of "knowingly and intentionally" transferring Social Security cards "with intent to defraud". On August 20, 2009 he pleaded guilty in federal court in Brooklyn to selling more than a dozen Social Security numbers for $10,000. He was handed a jail sentence of 3 months for the offense and had to report to prison by April 30, 2010.

Filmography

Film/Movie

Television

Video Games

References

External links

1975 births
Living people
American male film actors
Male actors from Chicago
African-American male actors
American male television actors
21st-century American male actors
20th-century American male actors
20th-century African-American people
21st-century African-American people